Glenwood is a town in Crenshaw County, Alabama, United States. At the 2020 census, the population was 152. Glenwood was incorporated in 1907.

Geography
Glenwood is located in eastern Crenshaw County at  (31.667771, −86.174962).

Demographics

As of the census of 2000, there were 191 people, 92 households, and 58 families residing in the town. The racial makeup of the town was 69.11% White, 29.84% Black or African American, and 1.05% from two or more races. 0.52% of the population were Hispanic or Latino of any race.

There were 92 households, out of which 25.0% had children under the age of 18 living with them, 47.8% were married couples living together, 12.0% had a female householder with no husband present, and 35.9% were non-families. 32.6% of all households were made up of individuals, and 14.1% had someone living alone who was 65 years of age or older. The average household size was 2.08 and the average family size was 2.59.

In the town, the population was spread out, with 18.3% under the age of 18, 5.2% from 18 to 24, 29.8% from 25 to 44, 27.7% from 45 to 64, and 18.8% who were 65 years of age or older. The median age was 44 years. For every 100 females, there were 85.4 males. For every 100 females age 18 and over, there were 75.3 males.

The median income for a household in the town was $28,750, and the median income for a family was $36,875. Males had a median income of $31,250 versus $21,250 for females. The per capita income for the town was $19,074. About 7.4% of families and 13.4% of the population were below the poverty line, including 21.2% of those under the age of eighteen and 25.0% of those 65 or over.

Notable person
 Hoyt Corkins, professional poker player

See also

 List of towns in Alabama

References

External links

Towns in Crenshaw County, Alabama
Towns in Alabama